Jõksi is a lake of Estonia.

See also
List of lakes of Estonia

Lakes of Estonia
Kanepi Parish
Lakes of Põlva County